Michael Peter Aldrete (born January 29, 1961) is an American former professional baseball first baseman/outfielder and current coach. He is currently the first base coach for the Oakland Athletics of Major League Baseball (MLB).

Career
Aldrete was a four-year letterman at Stanford University, where he received a Bachelor of Arts Degree in Communication .  He is a member of Delta Tau Delta International Fraternity. From  through , Aldrete played for the San Francisco Giants (1986–88), Montreal Expos (1989–90), San Diego Padres (1991), Cleveland Indians (1991), Oakland Athletics (1993–95), California Angels (1995–96) and New York Yankees (1996).  He batted and threw left-handed.  Chris Berman of ESPN referred to him as Mike "Enough" Aldrete.

Aldrete's best season was  when he hit .325 with 51 runs batted in (RBI), 50 runs, 116 hits and 18 doubles, all career-highs.

Aldrete's teams made the playoffs twice.  The Giants reached the 1987 National League Championship Series and he was a member of the 1996 World Series champion Yankees as they beat the Atlanta Braves.

In 930 games over 10 seasons, Aldrete posted a .263 batting average (565-for-2147) with 277 runs, 41 home runs, 271 RBI and 314 bases on balls. Defensively, he recorded a .993 fielding percentage playing primarily at first base and all three outfield positions.

Since 2001, Aldrete has maintained a role in professional baseball as a coach.  After three years in the minors in the Arizona Diamondbacks chain, he has been a first base coach for the Seattle Mariners and served as the hitting coach for the Diamondbacks (2005–06).  Aldrete served as assistant hitting coach for the St. Louis Cardinals since 2008 and was the bench coach for the Cardinals until leaving for the Oakland Athletics on October 27, 2014.

See also

List of St. Louis Cardinals coaches

References

External links

1961 births
Living people
American expatriate baseball players in Canada
Arizona Diamondbacks coaches
Baseball coaches from California
Baseball players from California
California Angels players
Cleveland Indians players
Colorado Springs Sky Sox players
Fresno Giants players
Great Falls Giants players
Indianapolis Indians players
Major League Baseball bench coaches
Major League Baseball first base coaches
Major League Baseball first basemen
Major League Baseball hitting coaches
Major League Baseball outfielders
Montreal Expos players
New York Yankees players
Oakland Athletics coaches
Oakland Athletics players
Phoenix Firebirds players
Phoenix Giants players
People from Carmel-by-the-Sea, California
St. Louis Cardinals coaches
San Diego Padres players
San Francisco Giants players
Seattle Mariners coaches
Shreveport Captains players
Stanford Cardinal baseball players
Syracuse SkyChiefs players
Tacoma Tigers players
Anchorage Bucs players